Bryant Fleming House is a historic home located at Wyoming in Wyoming County, New York.  It was built about 1850 and is a -story, two-by-three-bay cross-gabled vernacular Italianate-style cottage with a two-by-three-bay, 1-story rear wing.  Another main building is a multi-purpose "playhouse" designed for large-scale entertaining and accommodation of overnight guests.  The property includes notable landscape features that its principal owner, Bryant Fleming (1877–1946) designed and installed after he purchased the property about 1910.  Also on the property is a small decorative pool with fountain, two sets of stone and concrete steps, a garden gate, and brick walls with gate posts.

It was listed on the National Register of Historic Places in 2009.

Gallery

References

External links
Bryant Fleming | The Cultural Landscape Foundation

Houses on the National Register of Historic Places in New York (state)
Italianate architecture in New York (state)
Houses completed in 1850
Houses in Wyoming County, New York
National Register of Historic Places in Wyoming County, New York